The Comprehensive Addiction and Recovery Act (CARA) was signed into law by President Obama on July 22, 2016. The bill was introduced by Senator Sheldon Whitehouse and Representative Jim Sensenbrenner as the first major federal addiction act in 40 years.

CARA authorizes over $181 million to respond to the epidemic of opioid use disorder and is intended to greatly increase both prevention programs and the availability of treatment programs. While this bill authorized prevention and treatment programs, funding for its provisions had to come through Congress's appropriations process.

In May 2017, the Substance Abuse and Mental Health Services Administration (SAMHSA) announced grants totaling $2.6 million for recovery community organizations to build addiction recovery networks and engage in public education as authorized under CARA.

References  

Acts of the 114th United States Congress
Drug policy of the United States
Drug policy reform
Drugs in the United States
Opioids
Prevention in the United States
Substance dependence